Stan Wilson (12 October 1912 – 13 November 2004) was  a former Australian rules footballer who played with Essendon in the Victorian Football League (VFL).

Notes

External links 
		
Stan Wilson's profile at Australianfootball.com

1912 births
2004 deaths
Australian rules footballers from Victoria (Australia)
Essendon Football Club players